Cassinia ochracea is a species of flowering plant in the family Asteraceae and is endemic to south-eastern New South Wales. It is an erect or spreading shrub with hairy stems, needle-shaped leaves and flat or rounded corymbs of up to four hundred flower heads.

Description
The edges of the leaves are rolled under and the lower surface is densely covered with white, woolly hairs. Between 25 and 400 heads are arranged in flat or rounded corymbs.

Taxonomy and naming
Cassinia ochracea was first formally described in 2005 by Anthony Edward Orchard in Australian Systematic Botany from specimens collected south-west of Cooma in 2004. The specific epithet (ochracea) means "ochre-yellow".

Distribution
This species of Cassinia occurs on the Southern Highlands of New South Wales, mainly in Kosciuszko National Park.

References

ochracea
Asterales of Australia
Flora of New South Wales
Plants described in 2005